Retrorsia is a genus of mini-millipedes in the family Polydesmidae.

Species 

 Retrorsia benedictae Shelley, 2003
 Retrorsia gracilis Shear & Marek, 2021
 Retrorsia leonardi Shelley, 2003
 Retrorsia richarti Shear & Marek, 2021
 Retrorsia simplicissima Shear & Marek, 2021

References 

Polydesmida
Millipede genera